Gamston is a village and civil parish four miles south of Retford in the English county of Nottinghamshire. The village lies on the A638 road between Retford and the Markham Moor junction with the A1 and the A57 roads. The population of the civil parish as at the 2011 Census was 246. The River Idle lies to the west of the village.

St Peter's Church is a Grade I listed building. Gamston was home to a rectory in the past, and today forms the name of a lane in the village.

To the east of the village, beyond the East Coast railway line, is Gamston Wood. The area has been designated as a Site of Specific Interest.

Historical Events 
The village has played a significant role in Baptist history, especially as the baptismal place of the 'Baptist John Wesley', Dan Taylor. A Baptist congregation met in the village from about 1690, at first led by Aaron Jeffrey.

Education 

The village is home to one school, Gamston Church of England Primary School.

Retford Gamston Airport 

Retford Gamston Airport, a former RAF aerodrome, is a small airport based to the west of the village on the B6387 road. The airport is used for small private aircraft as well as the base for several flying schools.

References

External links

Villages in Nottinghamshire
Civil parishes in Nottinghamshire
Bassetlaw District